What a Wonderful World is the 36th studio album by country singer Willie Nelson released in March 1988.

Track listing
"Spanish Eyes" (Bert Kaempfert, Jerry Leiber, Charlie Singleton, Eddie Snyder, Phil Spector) - 3:33
 duet with Julio Iglesias
"Moon River" (Henry Mancini, Johnny Mercer)- 3:10
"Some Enchanted Evening" (Oscar Hammerstein II, Richard Rodgers) - 3:40
"What a Wonderful World" (George Douglas/Bob Thiele, George David Weiss)- 2:14
"South of the Border" (Michael Carr, Jimmy Kenned) - 3:17
"Ole Buttermilk Sky" (Jack Brooks, Hoagy Carmichael) - 2:48
"The Song from Moulin Rouge (Where Is Your Heart?)" (Georges Auric, William Engvick) - 2:53
"To Each His Own" (Ray Evans, Jay Livingston) - 3:37
"Twilight Time" (Alan Dunn. Artie Dunn, Al Nevins. Morton Nevins, Buck Ram) - 2:50
"Ac-Cent-Tchu-Ate the Positive" (Harold Arlen, Johnny Mercer) - 2:01

Personnel
Willie Nelson - guitar, vocals
Julio Iglesias - vocals on "Spanish Eyes"
Gene Chrisman - drums
Johnny Christopher - guitar, vocals
Bobby Emmons - keyboards
Mike Leech - bass guitar
Chips Moman - guitar, producer, engineer
Monique Moman - vocals
Mickey Raphael - harmonica
Toni Wine - vocals
Bobby Wood - keyboards, vocals
Reggie Young - guitar

Charts

Weekly charts

Year-end charts

References

1988 albums
Willie Nelson albums
Albums produced by Chips Moman
Columbia Records albums
Traditional pop albums
Covers albums